is a Japanese beach volleyball player.

External links
 
 

1975 births
Living people
Japanese men's volleyball players
Japanese beach volleyball players
Asian Games medalists in beach volleyball
Asian Games gold medalists for Japan
Medalists at the 2002 Asian Games
Beach volleyball players at the 2002 Asian Games
Beach volleyball players at the 2006 Asian Games
Place of birth missing (living people)